Lake Louisa State Park is a  Florida State Park located south of Clermont, in the northeast corner of the Green Swamp and the southwestern shore of Lake Louisa.  It is made up of bald cypress, live oak, and saw palmettos. In addition to Lake Louisa, the park contains Hammond Lake, Dixie Lake, Dude Lake, and Bear Lake, along with several smaller lakes.

Two small streams, Big Creek and Little Creek, flow north from the Green Swamp through the park into Lake Louisa.  Lake Louisa is the source of the Palatlakaha River, one of the headwaters of the Ocklawaha River.

An entrance on the western side of the park, off County Route 561 on Lake Nellie Road, gives access only to the horse trails.

Activities include swimming, picnicking, horseback riding, hiking, camping, fishing, and canoeing. Amenities include a canoe/kayak ramp,  of equestrian trails, and a primitive equestrian campground, as well as a  nature trail,  of hiking trails, fishing pier, canoe/kayak launch, and a picnic pavilion. The park is open from 8:00 am till sundown year-round.

The property was purchased by the state in 1973 and opened to the public in 1977.

Gallery

References

External links 

 Lake Louisa State Park at Florida State Parks
 Lake Louisa State Park at Absolutely Florida
 Lake Louisa State Park at Wildernet

Parks in Lake County, Florida
State parks of Florida